The Battle of Jeokjinpo was fought on 8 May 1592. After the Battle of Happo, further reports of an additional 13 Japanese ships prevented Yi Sun-sin and his fleet from resting long on the morning of 8 May. Admiral Yi once again ordered his fleet to pursue the Japanese in the direction of Jinhae. The Korean forces caught up with the Japanese ships at Jeokjinpo. The Koreans easily sank 11 Japanese warships.

References

Bibliography
 

Jeokjinpo
Yi Sun-sin